Melissa Bonny (born 23 January 1993) is a Swiss heavy metal singer and songwriter. She is the founder and vocalist of the symphonic metal band Ad Infinitum and was the vocalist of the bands Evenmore and Rage of Light.

Career
After graduating from school, Bonny was active in a cover band in the area around her hometown. She left in 2012 to join the symphonic folk metal band Evenmore as a singer. In 2015, she also joined the trance metal band Rage of Light. In 2018, Melissa Bonny ended her activities with Evenmore and formed the symphonic metal band Ad Infinitum. In addition to singing, she also writes lyrics and composes songs for the band. In early April 2021, she announced her departure from Rage of Light via her social media networks.

In mid-July 2021, the founding of the band The Dark Side of the Moon was announced. Alongside Bonny on vocals, the group consists of guitarist Hans Platz, harpist Jenny Diehl (both from Feuerschwanz) and drummer Morten Løwe Sørensen from Amaranthe. A record deal was signed with the Austrian record label Napalm Records. With the power metal band Warkings, she worked under the pseudonym Queen of the Damned on both albums as well as live performances.

Bonny possesses a mezzo-soprano voice. She also masters guttural singing, to which she also switches within songs.

Personal life
Since the end of 2020, Bonny has been living in Denmark with her boyfriend Morten Løwe Sørensen, the drummer of the band Amaranthe.

Discography

Evenmore
Studio albums:
 Last Ride (2016)
EPs:
 The Beginning (2014)

Rage of Light
Studio albums:
 Imploder (2019)
EPs:
 Chasing a Reflection (2016)

Ad Infinitum
Studio albums:
 Chapter I: Monarchy (2020)
 Chapter II: Legacy (2021)
 Chapter III: Downfall (2023)

The Dark Side of the Moon
Singles:
 Jenny of Oldstones (Game of Thrones cover) (2021)
 May It Be (The Lord of the Rings cover) (2022)
 Double Trouble / Lumos! (Hedwig's Theme) (Harry Potter cover) (2022)

Other appearances
 Warkings – Reborn (2018)
 Skeletoon – Farewell (Avantasia cover, 2019)
 Warkings – Revenge (2020)
 Feuerschwanz – Ding (Seeed cover, 2020)
 Feuerschwanz – Warriors of the World United (Manowar cover) (2021)
 Kamelot – New Babylon (2023)

References

External links 
 Official website

1993 births
Living people
People from Montreux
Swiss mezzo-sopranos
Swiss singer-songwriters
21st-century Swiss women singers
Swiss heavy metal singers
Swiss people of African descent
Women heavy metal singers